Hokes Bluff is a city in Etowah County, Alabama, United States. It is part of  the Gadsden Metropolitan Statistical Area. At the 2020 census, the population was 4,446.

History
Hokes Bluff was established on a high bluff overlooking the Coosa River. The town was called "The Bluff", and was used as a lookout station for Native American tribes, as they could see a great distance across, up and down the Coosa River. Hokes Bluff was one of the staging areas where the Cherokee were collected, and sent to Gunter's Landing (Guntersville), and west to Oklahoma on the Trail of Tears.

Settlers came into the area in the 1840s. Daniel Hoke Jr. was among the settlers, who came in 1850 and built a trading post and a blacksmith shop near the site of the bluff. The town was renamed "Hoke's Bluff" after him in 1853 by W.B. Wynne, a friend of Hoke. The town was raided and pillaged during the Civil War by raiding parties of both sides of the Union and the Confederacy. John Henry Wisdom, who became the "Paul Revere of the Confederacy" after making his famous ride from Gadsden to Rome during the Civil War, was a resident of Hokes Bluff.

A new mail route was established from Gadsden to Hokes Bluff in 1890. Before it was established, Hokes Bluff had poor mail service, receiving most mail by steamboat. The post office was established in 1877 and discontinued in 1931.

One legend associated with the town is about Tawannah Springs, the town's water supply. It is said that the springs are named for a Native American princess (Tawannah) who grieved herself to death after her cousin, Princess Noccalula, jumped herself to death at Noccalula Falls in Gadsden.

Hokes Bluff was incorporated in 1946 with a population of 1,200. W.B. Ford was the first mayor. In 1949, a water system was installed with a 75,000 gallon reservoir and 54 hydrants. In 1953, gas was installed in the town, and in 1956, the streets were paved.

Geography
It is bordered to the west by the cities of Gadsden (the county seat) and Glencoe, and to the northwest by the Coosa River. U.S. Route 278 passes through the city, leading west  to the center of Gadsden, and east  to Piedmont.

Demographics

2000 census
At the 2000 census there were 4,149 people in 1,638 households, including 1,272 families, in the city. The racial makeup of the city was 98.99% White, 0.10% Black or African American, 0.22% Native American, 0.07% Asian, 0.24% from other races, and 0.39% from two or more races. 0.46% of the population were Hispanic or Latino of any race.
Of the 1,638 households 32.1% had children under the age of 18 living with them, 67.6% were married couples living together, 7.3% had a female householder with no husband present, and 22.3% were non-families. 20.9% of households were one person and 11.1% were one person aged 65 or older. The average household size was 2.53 and the average family size was 2.93.

The age distribution was 22.9% under the age of 18, 7.1% from 18 to 24, 28.0% from 25 to 44, 26.7% from 45 to 64, and 15.3% 65 or older. The median age was 40 years. For every 100 females, there were 93.7 males. For every 100 females age 18 and over, there were 89.2 males.

The median household income was $37,923 and the median family income  was $42,534. Males had a median income of $32,444 versus $26,513 for females. The per capita income for the city was $17,476. About 3.8% of families and 4.3% of the population were below the poverty line, including 6.0% of those under age 18 and 1.7% of those age 65 or over.

2010 census
At the 2010 census there were 4,286 people in 1,747 households, including 1,287 families, in the city. The racial makeup of the city was 98.5% White, 0.3% Black or African American, 0.1% Native American, 0.4% Asian, 0.1% from other races, and 0.5% from two or more races. 0.2% of the population were Hispanic or Latino of any race.
Of the 1,747 households 28.4% had children under the age of 18 living with them, 60.2% were married couples living together, 9.9% had a female householder with no husband present, and 26.3% were non-families. 23.8% of households were one person and 11.7% were one person aged 65 or older. The average household size was 2.45 and the average family size was 2.88.

The age distribution was 21.7% under the age of 18, 6.6% from 18 to 24, 26.0% from 25 to 44, 28.3% from 45 to 64, and 17.4% 65 or older. The median age was 42.3 years. For every 100 females, there were 94.9 males. For every 100 females age 18 and over, there were 97.7 males.

The median household income was $54,668 and the median family income  was $67,857. Males had a median income of $47,424 versus $34,288 for females. The per capita income for the city was $26,375. About 1.6% of families and 4.1% of the population were below the poverty line, including 10.3% of those under age 18 and 1.9% of those age 65 or over.

2020 census

As of the 2020 United States census, there were 4,446 people, 1,610 households, and 1,046 families residing in the city.

Notable people
Isaac Haas, American basketball player
Linda Howard, Author
Steve Shields, Former professional baseball player, Atlanta Braves, New York Yankees, Seattle Mariners, Minnesota Twins
Drake White, country music singer

References

External links
City of Hokes Bluff official website

Cities in Alabama
Cities in Etowah County, Alabama